Sílvia Cristina Gustavo Rocha (born 14 May 1982) is a Brazilian former basketball player who competed in the 2004 Summer Olympics.

References

1982 births
Living people
Brazilian women's basketball players
Olympic basketball players of Brazil
Basketball players at the 2004 Summer Olympics